Joaquín Humberto Vela González (born 11 February 1954) is a Mexican politician from the Party of the Democratic Revolution (formerly from the Labor Party). From 2006 to 2009 he served as Deputy of the LX Legislature of the Mexican Congress representing  the State of Mexico.

References

1954 births
Living people
People from Aguascalientes City
Party of the Democratic Revolution politicians
Labor Party (Mexico) politicians
21st-century Mexican politicians
Members of the Chamber of Deputies (Mexico) for the State of Mexico